Sapri (Italian: Stazione di Sapri) is a railway station in Sapri, Campania, Italy, on the Salerno–Reggio Calabria railway. The train services are operated by Trenitalia. The station first opened on 30 July 1894.

Train services
The station is served by the following services:
Frecciarossa
InterCity
Treno interregionale
Treno regionale

In popular culture
Scenes from the James Bond film No Time to Die were filmed at the station and aboard a Frecciarossa 1000.

See also

 Ferrovie dello Stato Italiane

References

Railway stations in Campania
Buildings and structures in the Province of Salerno
Railway stations opened in 1894